The South American Football Confederation (CONMEBOL) is the administrative and controlling body for South American association football. It currently organizes four club competitions: the Copa Libertadores, the Copa Sudamericana, the Recopa Sudamericana, as well as the Suruga Bank Championship (in conjunction with the Japan Football Association). CONMEBOL was also responsible for the running of several other discontinued competitions, the most notable of which were the Supercopa Libertadores (from 1989 to 1997), the Copa CONMEBOL (from 1992 to 1999), the Copa Mercosur and the Copa Merconorte (from 1998 to 2001). It  also held minor continental Copas, some of them with only one edition: the Copa de Oro, Copa Master de Supercopa and Copa Master de CONMEBOL in the 1990s, and the Copa Ganadores de Copa in 1970.

At intercontinental level, together with the Union of European Football Associations (UEFA), CONMEBOL organized the Intercontinental Cup, which was held from 1960 to 2004, and two editions of the Intercontinental Champions' Supercup, in the 1960s. With the Confederation of North, Central America and Caribbean Association Football (CONCACAF), the South American confederation jointly held the Copa Interamericana intermittently, from 1969 to 1998. Included in this list is the FIFA Club World Cup, a FIFA club competition that merged with the Intercontinental Cup in 2005.

Winners

By club
Boca Juniors and Independiente, from Argentina, have won the most CONMEBOL club competitions, with 18. Brazil's São Paulo and Argentina's River Plate follow in the list, having won 12 competitions. Boca Juniors holds the record for the most Recopa Sudamericana titles, winning it four times, and two Copa Sudamericana titles, a joint-record with Independiente, Brazil's Athletico Paranaense and Independiente del Valle from Ecuador. It is also one of the best performing teams in the Intercontinental Cup, with three titles, a joint-record with Uruguayan clubs Peñarol and Nacional. Independiente is the most successful club in the Copa Libertadores, being champions seven times (four in  row, record), and in the Copa Interamericana, with three titles.  Two titles is the record in the Supercopa Libertadores, jointly held by Independiente and Cruzeiro from Brazil. Brazilian club Atlético Mineiro and Colombia's Atlético Nacional are the best performing clubs in the Copa CONMEBOL and the Copa Merconorte, respectively, also with two titles. No club has ever won all the competitions, but Independiente, Boca Juniors, São Paulo and River Plate have won seven different CONMEBOL tournaments. River Plate is the first and only team to simultaneously hold CONMEBOL's four current international competitions, after winning the 2014 Copa Sudamericana, 2015 Recopa Sudamericana, the 2015 Copa Libertadores, and the 2015 Suruga Bank Championship.

The following table lists the total number of CONMEBOL club competitions won by clubs, and is updated as of March 2023, in chronological order.

Key

By country
Argentine clubs are the most successful in CONMEBOL competitions, having won 75 titles. Argentine clubs have won the Copa Libertadores a record 25 times, and have also won the most Copa Sudamericana, Intercontinental Cup, and Supercopa Libertadores titles. Brazilian clubs, with 63 titles in total (67 with the FIFA Club World Cup titles added), have more wins in the Copa CONMEBOL, the Recopa Sudamericana, and the Copa Mercosur. Uruguayan clubs are third in total number of CONMEBOL trophies won, with 18. Venezuela is the only CONMEBOL member federation whose clubs have never won any competition at an  international level, while a Mexican club (from CONCACAF) has won a South American club competition once.

The following table lists the total number of titles won by clubs from each country, and is updated as of March 2023.

Key

See also
List of UEFA club competition winners

References
General

Specific

External links
CONMEBOL official website